The Marysville Historic Commercial District, in Marysville, California, is a  historic district which was listed on the National Register of Historic Places in 1999.

The district included 59 contributing buildings and 27 non-contributing ones, on parts of 14 blocks.  It is roughly bounded by First, Sixth, C, and E Streets.

It includes Mission/Spanish Revival and Italianate architecture.

References

National Register of Historic Places in Yuba County, California
Historic districts on the National Register of Historic Places in California
Italianate architecture in California
Mission Revival architecture in California